The keeled box turtle (Cuora mouhotii; syn. Pyxidea mouhotii) is a species of turtle in the family Geoemydidae. The species is endemic to Asia.

Geographic range
C. mouhotii occurs in Burma, China, India, Laos, and Vietnam, and also in Bhutan and Thailand.

Common names
Other common names for C. mouhotii include keel-backed terrapin, jagged-shelled turtle, and Mouhot's turtle.

Etymology
The specific name, mouhotii, is in honor of Alexandre Henri Mouhot, a French naturalist and explorer.

The subspecific name, obsti, is in honor of Fritz Jürgen Obst (1939–2018), a German herpetologist.

Taxonomy
C. mouhotii is sometimes treated as the sole species of the monotypic genus Pyxidea. Phylogenetic analysis using mitochondrial DNA has provided evidence that the species is part of the "Cuora group", a monophyletic group of Asian box turtles, and the name Pyxidea should probably be synonymized with Cuora, making the keeled box turtle part of that genus. Other phylogenetic studies of Cuora support this conclusion. In addition, its morphology is not distinct enough from that of Cuora species to keep it separate, and it is known to hybridize with Cuora galbinifrons.

Subspecies
There are two subspecies which are recognized as being valid.
Cuora mouhotii mouhotii 
Cuora mouhotii obsti 

Nota bene: A trinomial authority in parentheses indicates that the subspecies was originally described in a genus other than Cuora.

Hybridization
The southern Vietnamese population of Cuora mouhotii lives alongside Cuora picturata. Since Cuora mouhotii is known to hybridize with the closest living relatives of Cuora picturata (Cuora galbinifrons and Cuora bourreti ) there is a possibility of hybridization in the wild between these two populations.

Description
The keeled box turtle's upper shell (carapace) has three large, raised ridges and is serrated on the back end.  The lower shell (plastron) is different variations of brown in color, ranging from light brown to dark brown.  The upper jaw is strong, while the snout is short and curved. The feet are only partially webbed, which suggest a terrestrial lifestyle as opposed to an aquatic one.

Male and female keeled box turtles can be distinguished by the color of their eyes as well as their nails.  A male generally has longer and thicker nails than a female, and eyes that are either black or brown.  A female generally has shorter, thinner nails, and eyes that are orange or red.

Biology
The biology of C. mouhotii is not well known.

The breeding season is in May through September. On average they typically lay two clutches in a breeding season. Like many other turtles the keeled box turtle does not care for its young. Females have been noted to dig nests with their rear legs and cover the clutches with soil, and also to lay eggs under fallen leaves.

The male keeled box turtle is very aggressive during the act of mating. In some instances the male turtle will chase and injure a female. The male will often persist until the female allows its advances.

Diet
The keeled box turtle is herbivorous, and eats a wide variety of vegetation in the natural environment, with a preference for wild fallen fruits. It will also occasionally eat worms, snails, and other meat.

Habitat
The keeled box turtle is a terrestrial species, and can be frequently found in small caves and rock crevices. It can also be found in forests, in deep layers of leaves.

Conservation status
C. mouhotii is listed as an endangered species by the International Union for Conservation of Nature (IUCN).

The population of the keeled box turtle has been on a steep decline in some areas, particularly Vietnam. This can be attributed to people capturing it for food and pets, as well as Vietnam legally exporting large numbers. Although there are other possible reasons behind this population decline, deforestation and hunting have proven to be a major threat to this turtle especially.

Threats include habitat destruction and degradation during deforestation. In parts of its range it is threatened by overexploitation as it is collected from the wild, especially for food. It is also used in traditional medicine. It is consumed locally and traded internationally for the food market and the pet trade.

In China the species is bred in captivity on a small scale for the pet trade.

Gallery

References

Further reading
Bernhardt K (1995). "Pyxidea mouhotii (Gray 1862)". J. AG Schildkr. Panzerechsen 95 (2): 7–18. (in German).
Boulenger GA (1889). Catalogue of the Chelonians, Rhynchocephalians, and Crocodiles in the British Museum (Natural History). New Edition. London: Trustees of the British Museum (Natural History). (Taylor and Francis, printers). x + 311 pp. + Plates I-III. (Cyclemys mouhotii, pp. 132–133).
Boulenger GA (1890). The Fauna of British India, Including Ceylon and Burma. Reptilia and Batrachia. London: Secretary of State for India in Council. (Taylor and Francis, printers). xviii + 541 pp. (Cyclemys mouhoti, p. 31).
Das I (2002). A Photographic Guide to Snakes and other Reptiles of India. Sanibel Island, Florida: Ralph Curtis Books. 144 pp. . (Pyxidea mouhotii, p. 131).
Günther ACLG (1864). The Reptiles of British India. London: The Ray Society. (Taylor and Francis, printers). xxvii + 452 pp. + Plates I-XXVI. (Pyxidea mouhotii, p. 16 + Plate IV, figure D).
Smith MA (1931). The Fauna of British India, Including Ceylon and Burma. Reptilia and Amphibia. Vol. I.—Loricata, Testudines. London: Secretary of State for India in Council. (Taylor and Francis, printers). xxviii + 185 pp. + Plates I-II. (Cyclemys mouhoti, pp. 78–80, Figure 14).

External links
Gray JE (1862). "Notice of a new Species of Cyclemys from the Lao Mountains, in Siam". Journal of Natural History, Third Series 10: 157. (Cyclemys mouhotii, new species).
Gray JE (1863). "Observations on the Box Tortoises, with the Descriptions of Three New Asiatic Species". Proceedings of the Zoological Society of London 1863: 173-179.
Parham JF, et al. (2001). "New Chinese turtles: endangered or invalid? A reassessment of two species using mitochondrial DNA, allozyme electrophoresis and known-locality specimens". Animal Conservation 4 (4): 357–367.
Photo gallery: Pyxidea. World Chelonian Trust.

Geoemydidae
Reptiles of South Asia
Reptiles described in 1862
Taxa named by John Edward Gray
Reptiles of Southeast Asia
Reptiles of China
Endangered Fauna of China